Mario Bertok (2 September 1929 – 20 August 2008) was a Croatian chess master and sports journalist, writing for the Sportske novosti daily sports newspaper. He was born in Zagreb, Yugoslavia.

Bertok earned the International Master title in 1957.  He represented Yugoslavia on board four at the 1960 Chess Olympiad, scoring +5=5−3.  A second-place finish in the 1960 Yugoslav Championship earned Bertok a berth in the 1960 Budapest Zonal where he placed 2nd, taking third after a playoff.
At the 1962 Stockholm Interzonal he finished 17th.
His best international result was Rovinj-Zagreb 1970 where he finished 9th=.

Bertok's wife was a well-known Yugoslav actress Semka Sokolović-Bertok (1935–2008), who herself was a competitive chess player in her youth.

On 20 August 2008, Bertok was reported missing after a few hours of swimming off the shores of Jarun Lake; his body was recovered from the lake later the same day.

References

External links

1929 births
2008 deaths
Croatian chess players
Yugoslav chess players
Chess International Masters
Sportspeople from Zagreb
Croatian sports journalists
Accidental deaths in Croatia
20th-century chess players
Deaths by drowning
20th-century journalists
Journalists from Zagreb